Barro Alto is a municipality in the state of Bahia in the North-East region of Brazil.

References

External links
http://www.salobro.com
http://www.lagoafunda.br21.com

Municipalities in Bahia